The Gambia national basketball team represents The Gambia in international competitions. It is administrated by the Gambia Basketball Association (GBA).

The team's best international performance to date was 9th place at the 1978 African Basketball Championship.

Several Gambian basketball players play for professional teams throughout Europe. Yet, the last time the country's national team attempted to qualify for the official African Basketball Championship dates back to 2005. 

The most well-known basketball player with Gambian roots is NBA player Dennis Schröder, whose mother grew up in Gambia.

Competitive record

Summer Olympics
yet to qualify

World championship
yet to qualify

FIBA Africa Championship

African Games

yet to qualify

Current roster
Team for the FIBA Africa Championship 2005 qualification: (last publicized squad)

Notable players
Notable players from the Gambia:

References

External links
Presentation on Facebook
Archived records of Gambia team participations

Men's national basketball teams
Basketball
Basketball in the Gambia
1972 establishments in the Gambia